Robert Patton-Spruill is an independent film director, screenwriter, producer, professor, master distiller, and real estate empresario. His company, FilmShack, was based in Boston. Spruill lives in Winchester, New Hampshire where he founded New England Sweetwater Farm and Distillery in 2015. Spruill was a professor at Emerson College, where he was Director in Residence until his retirement in 2020.

Biography

Spruill was born in Roxbury and raised by theatre artists James Spruill and Lynda Patton, who worked with the New African Company. He is a second cousin of Boston's first black and first female mayor Kim Janey through his maternal side. He attended Boston University as a history major, but decided to pursue film instead, and wrote the screenplay for his first film Squeeze while still in college. Squeeze (1997) was shot on a US$155,000 budget, and was cast with young Boston theatre students whom Spruill taught at the Dorchester Youth Collaborative. Squeeze was bought by Miramax at the Los Angeles Independent Film Festival, after which Spruill was signed for international representation by the William Morris Agency in Hollywood. Patton-Spruill later moved back to Boston where he subsequently directed three more motion pictures. He currently resides in Winchester, New Hampshire with his wife, Patricia Moreno, who he met during his time at BU and his only child, Alejandra Spruill, a Boston Latin School and Emerson College graduate.

Films & Career 

After his first film, Patton-Spruill directed Body Count (1998), a straight-to-video Showtime feature, after which he and his wife Patti Moreno over a 10-year period opened their own production company, studio, and rental business for low-budget filmmakers in his home town of Roxbury, MA. Since the opening of FilmShack in 2000, Spruill and Moreno produced numerous short films, music videos and independent features, including Turntable (AFI Film Festival, 2005). The music video Spruill directed for the popular hip hop band Public Enemy led to the production of the full-length documentary Welcome to the Terrordome (2007).

Spruill made the documentary Do It Again in 2010, which followed Boston Globe reporter Geoff Edgers on his irrational quest to reunite the classic rock band The Kinks. Do It Again premiered at the Rotterdam International Film Festival on January 28, 2010, and was shown at several film festivals.

Other work directed by Spruill includes Garden Girl TV, a web series starring his wife as Patti Moreno the Garden Girl. The website has produced over 200 how-to videos about urban gardening, and FilmShack produces gardening and home improvement videos for  HGTV.com.

Patton Spruill has taught at Emerson College, Massachusetts College of Art, and Curry College.

References

External links 
 Filmshack
 Garden Girl TV
 
 Film Skills

Living people
American film directors
Year of birth missing (living people)